Gessinger is a German surname.

Notable people
Notable people with this surname include:
 Humberto Gessinger (born 1963), Brazilian musician
 Julius Gessinger (de) (1899-1986), German composer
 Marie-Christine Gessinger (1992-2010), Austrian model
 Nils Gessinger (de) (born 1964), German musician
 Seff Gessinger (de) (1915-1988), German composer